A trade item is an item that is the subject of trade.  It is a term used primarily by people in supply chain management and logistic engineering. An often used term in the Journals of the Lewis and Clark Expedition.

See also 
Goods

References

Supply chain management